Attorney General of Grenada is the chief law officer in Grenada.

List of attorneys general of Grenada
 Grenada became British colony, 1763
 Hew Dalrymple
 Edward Horne c.1770 
 Sir George Staunton, 1st Baronet 1779–1784
 Sir Arthur Leary Piggott <1784 (to England, 1783)
 Ashton Warner Byam 1783-1789
 Kenneth Francis Mackenzie 1793-
 John Sharpe c.1810 
 William Darnell Davis c.1840 
 Henry James Ross 1856–1857
 Archibald Piguenit Burt  1868–?1871  (died 1871)
 William Anthony Musgrave Sheriff 1872–1880 
 Henry Rawlins Pipon Schooles ?–1896 
 Leslie Probyn 1896–?
 Charles Henry Major 1901–1902
 Nicholas Julian Paterson 1920s
 James Henry Jarret 1929–1930 
 Keith Hennessey Conrad Alleyne 1968–1971
 Ernest W. John 1970's
 Grenada became independent, 1974
 Desmond Christian ?-1976 (deported)
 Lloyd Noel 1979–1980
 Kendrick Radix 1981
 Richard Hart 1982–1983
 Anthony Rushford 1983
 Francis Alexis 1984–1987
 Daniel Williams ?1987–1989 (later Governor-General of Grenada, 1996)
 Francis Alexis 1990–1995
 Errol Thomas 1996–2001
 Lawrence Albert Joseph 2001
 Raymond Anthony 2001–?
 James A.L. Bristol 2008–2009
 Rohan Philip 2009–?
 Elvin Nimrod 2013
 Cajeton Hood 2013–2019 
 Darsham Ramdhani 2019–2020
 Dia Forrester 2021–2022
 Claudette Joseph 2022–present

See also

 Justice ministry
 Politics of Grenada

References

 
Government of Grenada
Justice ministries